Ross H. Garber (born April 3, 1967) is an American lawyer, professor, and legal analyst. He provides on-air commentary for CNN and teaches Political Investigations and Impeachment at Tulane Law School. He is considered a legal expert in the field of political investigations and impeachment. He is a former partner in the law firm Shipman & Goodwin and a contributing author to Ethical Standards in the Public Sector.

Early life and education

Garber grew up in Uncasville, Connecticut, and although Jewish, attended the Roman Catholic Saint Bernard School. He graduated from the University of Connecticut and went on to earn his Juris Doctor from University of Connecticut School of Law.

Career

Garber is considered a legal expert on political investigations and impeachment. He defended four United States governors facing impeachment, including:
 Governor John G. Rowland of Connecticut 
 Governor Mark Sanford of South Carolina 
 Governor Robert J. Bentley of Alabama 
 Governor Eric Greitens of Missouri

Garber was a partner at Shipman & Goodwin where he chaired the firm's government investigations and white collar defense group.
 
Garber argued before the U.S. Court of Appeals for the Second Circuit that public officials and government lawyers have an attorney-client privilege in grand jury investigations. In 2005, the court agreed, rejecting contrary holdings of the U.S. Courts of Appeals for the Seventh, Eight, and District of Columbia.
 
As of 2018, Garber works as an on-air legal analyst for CNN and teaches Political Investigations and Impeachment Law at Tulane Law School. He has written for The Los Angeles Times and the Washington Post as well as appeared on The Beat with Ari Melber. He is also a contributing author for Ethical Standards in the Public Sector.

References

External links
 We may never find out what Robert Mueller discovers

1967 births
Living people
CNN people
University of Connecticut School of Law alumni
University of Connecticut alumni
Tulane University Law School faculty
American lawyers
American people of Jewish descent